This article is a list of seasons completed by the Los Angeles Rams American football franchise (known as the Cleveland Rams from 1936 to 1945 and the St. Louis Rams from 1995 to 2015) in organized play. The list documents the season-by-season records of the Los Angeles Rams franchise from 1936 to present, including conference standings, division standings, postseason records, league awards for individual players or head coaches, and team awards for individual players. The Rams franchise was founded in Cleveland in 1936 when the team was playing in the newly formed American Football League (AFL). The franchise joined the National Football League (NFL) the following year. In 1943 operations were suspended due a depleted player roster due to World War II, and play resumed the following year. The Rams were the only team to suspend completely in 1943. The franchise has changed home cities three times: moving to Los Angeles in 1946, moving to St. Louis in 1995, and returning to Los Angeles in 2016.

The franchise has had four periods of success in their history. The first period of success came as the Cleveland Rams in NFL when they won the NFL Championship. This period continued until the 1950s as the Los Angeles Rams with them making the playoffs a further five times. The second period of success lasted over 20 years between – where the Rams made the playoffs 16 times and captured ten NFC Division titles including a then-record run of seven in a row from the 1973 season through the 1979 seasons (the New England Patriots broke the record with nine straight AFC East division titles from the 2009 season through the 2017 season). However, this period of success was marred by the fact that the franchise did not win the Super Bowl and only one Conference Championship. This period continued until  but the franchise failed to win another Super Bowl and suffered a surprise defeat to the New England Patriots in Super Bowl XXXVI. The current and most recent era has come following their return to Los Angeles, where the team has visited two Super Bowls under coach Sean McVay, winning Super Bowl LVI against the Cincinnati Bengals, becoming just the second team in the Super Bowl era to win a Super Bowl in their home stadium.

Alternating with their successful periods, the Rams have experienced severe periods of failure. Their three-season record between 2007 and 2009 of 6–42 was the worst over such a period between the Chicago Cardinals during World War II and the 4–44 Cleveland Browns from 2015 to 2017.

Over the course of the Rams’ 85-year history, they have won 15 division titles. They have appeared in the postseason 32 times, winning five NFC Championships. During the Super Bowl era, they have played in five Super Bowls, winning two.

Seasons

Footnotes

References

 
 
 
 
 
 

Seasons
Los Angeles Rams
 
 
 
Seasons